The following lists events that happened during 2001 in Sri Lanka.

Incumbents
President: Chandrika Kumaratunga
Prime Minister: Ratnasiri Wickremanayake (until 7 December); Ranil Wickremesinghe (starting 7 December)
Chief Justice: Sarath N. Silva

Governors
 Central Province – Tudor Dassanayake (until 1 January); K. B. Ratnayake (starting 1 January)
 North Central Province – G. M. S. Samaraweera 
 North Eastern Province – Asoka Jayawardena  
 North Western Province – Siripala Jayaweera 
 Sabaragamuwa Province – C. N. Saliya Mathew 
 Southern Province – Ananda Dassanayake (until January); Kingsley Wickramaratne (starting 1 February)
 Uva Province – Sirisena Amarasiri 
 Western Province – Pathmanathan Ramanathan

Chief Ministers
 Central Province – Sarath Ekanayake 
 North Central Province – Berty Premalal Dissanayake
 North Western Province – S. B. Nawinne
 Sabaragamuwa Province – Asoka Jayawardena (until 13 December); Mohan Ellawala (starting 13 December)
 Southern Province – Mahinda Yapa Abeywardena (until 21 December); H. G. Sirisena (starting 21 December)
 Uva Province – Samaraweera Weerawanni (until 29 October); Aththintha Marakalage Buddhadasa (starting 29 October)
 Western Province – Reginald Cooray

Events
 The LTTE launch a bold attack on Bandaranaike Airport, this would become one of the most bold attacks launched by the organization to date. Multiple aircraft ranging from civilian airlines to military helicopters were destroyed and damaged, much of the nations tourist industry was effected.
 The Tamil National Alliance becomes a political alliance of Sri Lanka in October 2001, and begins participating in elections. The formation of the party is an attempt to reduce segregation of ethnic Tamils in the region whom are considered a minority.

Notes

a.  Gunaratna, Rohan. (1998). Pg.353, Sri Lanka's Ethnic Crisis and National Security, Colombo: South Asian Network on Conflict Research.

References

 
Years of the 21st century in Sri Lanka
Sri Lanka